Ragnar Krogius (17 March 1903 – 31 December 1980) was a Finnish chess player, Finnish Chess Championship winner (1932).

Biography
From the begin of 1930s to the late 1940s, Ragnar Krogius was one of Finland's leading chess players. In 1932, he won the title of Finnish Chess Champion in a match against Eero Böök – 7 : 3, but lost that title a year later in a match against Birger Axel Rasmusson – 3½ : 6½.

Ragnar Krogius played for Finland in the Chess Olympiads:
 In 1930, at second board in the 3rd Chess Olympiad in Hamburg (+3, =2, -10),
 In 1935, at fourth board in the 6th Chess Olympiad in Warsaw (+4, =6, -7).

Ragnar Krogius played for Finland in the unofficial Chess Olympiad:
 In 1936, at second reserve board in the 3rd unofficial Chess Olympiad in Munich (+5, =5, -8).

References

External links

Ragnar Krogius chess games at 365chess.com

1903 births
1980 deaths
People from Vyborg District
Finnish chess players
Chess Olympiad competitors
20th-century chess players